Samandar Hamroqulov (sometimes spelled Samandar  Khamrakulov in English)  born 23 December 1978),is an Uzbek pop singer, actor, Honored Artist of Uzbekistan (2007). Samandar became famous in Uzbekistan in 2002 with the song "Sevgi fazosi". He sings in both Uzbek and Russian.

In addition to singing, Samandar also plays a role in films. Samandar played his first starring role in the 1999 film "Chayon Gul". His role in the 2005 film "Yarim baxt" brought Samandar even more popularity. After these successes, Samandar starred in several films.

Biography 
He was born on December 23, 1978 in Namangan in the family of Rustam Hamroqulov. He went to school No. 2 named after Farobi in Namangan. From 1996 to 2000 he studied at the Faculty of Musical Drama of the Tashkent State Institute of Arts. The main reason Samandar entered the arts was because he was born into a comedian family. The singer is best known for his song "Sevgi fazosi", which is the first work of the singer. Later, the soundtrack "Sen o'zing" from "Muhabbat sinovlari" by Rustam Sadiev, shot in 2002, became very popular and became a hit. The singer also tried his hand at acting and had some success. Samandar married Dilnoza Mamatova on August 10, 2007.

Family 
 Father, Hamroqulov Rustamali Ikromalievich (1953-1989) — Laureate of the Order of Lenin of the USSR, Honored Artist of the Uzbek SSR.
 Mother, Yuldasheva Mavluda Mamadaliyevna (1953) — philologist (teacher of native language and literature of the highest category).
 Brother, Hamroqulov Iskandar Rustamalievich (1977) — actor, comedian.
 Sister, Hamroqulova Sevara Rustamaliyevna (1981) — satire theater actress.
 Wife, Hamroqulova (Mamatova) Dilnoza Alisherovna (1989) — philologist (French teacher).

Acting career 
Samandar has portrayed main characters in several Uzbek movies. Yarim baxt, in which Samandar played the lead role, did well in box office and Samandar received positive reviews for his role. He also played the leading role in the 2017 Uzbek movie "Notanish yulduzlar". The soundtrack for the movie "Sevgi fazosi" was sung by Samandar himself. Samandar played at movie celled Yangi boy which was popular among uzbek people.

Discography

Studio albums 
 "Sevgi fazosi" (2002)
 "Samandar tangosi" (2005)

Filmography
This is a chronologically-ordered list of films in which Samandar has appeared.

Music videos

Awards 
 Winner in the nomination "Tarona Taqdimoti - 2002" - "Novelty of the Year in Music".
 Winner "Nihol-2003".
 Winner in the nomination "Tarona Taqdimoti - 2004" - "Singer of the Year".
 In 2007 he was awarded the title of "Honored Artist of Uzbekistan".

References 

1978 births
Uzbeks
Living people
People from Namangan
Uzbekistani film actors
21st-century Uzbekistani male singers
20th-century Uzbekistani actors
21st-century Uzbekistani actors
Folk-pop singers